In the 1999–2000 season, USM Blida is competing in the National 1 for the 15th season, as well as the Algerian Cup. They will be competing in Ligue 1, and the Algerian Cup.

Squad list

Competitions

Overview

{| class="wikitable" style="text-align: center"
|-
!rowspan=2|Competition
!colspan=8|Record
!rowspan=2|Started round
!rowspan=2|Final position / round
!rowspan=2|First match	
!rowspan=2|Last match
|-
!
!
!
!
!
!
!
!
|-
| National 1

|  
| 4th
| 14 October 1999
| 29 June 2000
|-
| Algerian Cup

| Round of 64 
| Round of 8
| 3 March 2000
| 8 June 2000
|-
| League Cup

| Group stage
| Group stage
| 23 December 1999
| 3 February 2000
|-
! Total

National

League table

Results summary

Results by round

Matches

Algerian Cup

Algerian League Cup

Group stage

Squad information

Playing statistics
Only 11 games from 22 in National appearances 

|-
! colspan=10 style=background:#dcdcdc; text-align:center| Goalkeepers

|-
! colspan=10 style=background:#dcdcdc; text-align:center| Defenders

|-
! colspan=10 style=background:#dcdcdc; text-align:center| Midfielders

|-
! colspan=10 style=background:#dcdcdc; text-align:center| Forwards

|-
! colspan=10 style=background:#dcdcdc; text-align:center| Players transferred out during the season

Goalscorers
Includes all competitive matches. The list is sorted alphabetically by surname when total goals are equal.

[Assists]

Clean sheets
Includes all competitive matches.

Transfers

In

Out

References

External links
 1999–2000 USM Blida season at dzfoot.com 

USM Blida seasons
Algerian football clubs 1999–2000 season